Rumex alpinus, common name monk's-rhubarb, Munk's rhubarb or Alpine dock, is a leafy perennial herb in the family Polygonaceae. It is native to upland areas of Europe and Western Asia.

Description
Rumex alpinus is a perennial plant with a creeping rhizome. The stem is erect, striated and unbranched until just below the inflorescence. The leaves are very large, ovate-round, with long stout leaf stalks and irregular margins. The basal leaves have a hairless upper surface but have some hairs beside the veins on the lower surface. The upper leaves are alternate and are smaller and more elongated. Where their stalks meet the stem there is a membranous ochrea formed by the fusion of two stipules into a sheath which surrounds the stem and has a ragged upper margin. The flowers are arranged in much-branched, dense terminal compound panicles. The flowers are dioecious and anemophilous. The perianth segments are in two whorls of three. The outer ones are recurved and the inner ones form fruit valves, which are roundly, wider than long, with cordate bases and entire margins. There are six stamens, a pistil formed of three fused carpels, and three styles. The fruits are brown, three-sided achenes. The flowers bloom from June to August.

Distribution

Monk's-rhubarb is native to Central and Southern Europe and to Western Asia. It is naturalized in Britain.

Habitat
It can be found in arable land, fields, yards, rubbish dumps, roadsides and shores.

References

 Biolib: Rumex alpinus
 Catalogue of Life: Rumex alpinus 
 

alpinus
Alpine flora
Flora of the Alps
Flora of the Caucasus
Flora of the Pyrenees
Flora of Europe
Flora of Western Asia
Plants described in 1753
Taxa named by Carl Linnaeus
Dioecious plants